Bomba on Panther Island is a 1949 American adventure film directed by Ford Beebe and starring Johnny Sheffield. It is the second in the 12-film Bomba series following Bomba the Jungle Boy (1949).

Premise
A developer brings his sister with him to Africa and plans to build a plantation. Commissioner Barnes and Eli appear to lend him a hand, but unfortunately for them (and Bomba's monkey friend) a rogue panther is on the loose. Bomba, with revenge on his mind, is hunting the panther when he comes upon the construction site. He gets sidetracked by the sister (Roberts) and her exotic traveling companion (Lita Baron), but recovers in time to battle the panther.

Cast
 Johnny Sheffield as Bomba 
 Allene Roberts as Judy Maitland
 Lita Baron as Losana
 Harry Lewis as Comm. Andy Barnes
 Charles Irwin as Robert Maitland
 Smoki Whitfield as Eli

References

External links

1949 films
American adventure films
Films directed by Ford Beebe
Films produced by Walter Mirisch
Monogram Pictures films
1949 adventure films
American black-and-white films
1940s American films